The Espace Métal is a museum located in the ancient Charcoal Hall at Grossouvre, near to St Amand Monrond in the Cher department in the Centre-Val de Loire region of France.
The museum is an Anchor point on the European Route of Industrial Heritage.

Context

References

External links

 Museum Website

Museums in Cher (department)
Industry museums in France
European Route of Industrial Heritage Anchor Points